"Unconditional Love" is a single from Against Me!, released on a 7" picture disc on May 26, 2014, on Total Treble Music, with a digital release on June 9.

Background 
The title track appears as the third track on Against Me!'s sixth studio album, Transgender Dysphoria Blues, while the b-side is a newly recorded song, "500 Years", which was played live (albeit in acoustic form) by Laura Jane Grace in 2012.

Track listing

Personnel

Band 
 Laura Jane Grace – lead vocals, guitar, bass (track 2), producer
 James Bowman – guitar, backing vocals
 Atom Willard – drums, percussion

Additional musicians 
 Fat Mike – bass (track 1)

See also 
Against Me! discography

References 

2014 singles
2014 songs
Against Me! songs
Songs written by Laura Jane Grace